Gerald Edward "River" Shannon (October 25, 1910 – May 6, 1983) was a Canadian ice hockey left winger who played five seasons in the National Hockey League for the Ottawa Senators, St. Louis Eagles, Boston Bruins and Montreal Maroons between 1933 and 1938. Prior to turning professional he spent several years playing amateur senior hockey, and finished his career with three seasons in the minor International American Hockey League, retiring in 1940. He was born in Campbellford, Ontario.

Career statistics

Regular season and playoffs

External links

Obituary at LostHockey.com

1910 births
1983 deaths
Boston Bruins players
Boston Cubs players
Canadian expatriate ice hockey players in the United States
Canadian ice hockey left wingers
Hershey Bears players
Ice hockey people from Ontario
Montreal Maroons players
Ottawa Senators (1917) players
Ottawa Senators (original) players
People from Northumberland County, Ontario
Providence Reds players
St. Louis Eagles players
Springfield Indians players